is a Japanese voice actress and singer affiliated with Arts Vision. Yamazaki has had main roles in several anime shows including as Tomoyo Kanzaki in When Supernatural Battles Became Commonplace, Lilith Bristol in Absolute Duo, and Mero in Monster Musume.

Appearance

Television animation

2011
 YuruYuri as Eri's mother, girl student A, Hiro Takaoka, light music club member, student, visiting salesperson

2012
 Kokoro Connect as Kaidō
 YuruYuri♪♪ as Elementary school teacher, Eri's mother, ōmuro family's mother, TV newscaster 
 Hayate the Combat Butler! Heaven Is a Place on Earth as Ruka Suirenji
 Hayate the Combat Butler! Can't Take My Eyes Off You as Ruka Suirenji
 Lagrange: The Flower of Rin-ne as Kana Nitta
 Say I Love You as boy, female student, Izumi

2013
 Vividred Operation as Mizuha Amagi
 Hayate the Combat Butler! Cuties as Ruka Suirenji
 High School DxD New as Aika Kiriyuu
 AKB0048 as audience A
 Oreshura as Satuki Aoba, Yoshino Suzumiya, female student
 Kotoura-san as girl
 The Pet Girl of Sakurasou as Hase Kanna
 Suisei no Gargantia as Parinuri
 Stella Women's Academy, High School Division Class C³ as Miyagi Motiduki
 Da Capo III
 A Certain Scientific Railgun as older sister, woman
 Nagi-Asu: A Lull in the Sea as Nachi Yanagi
 The Devil Is a Part-Timer! as Kaori Shouji, clerk
 Free! as girl
 White Album 2 as Aki Hukaya
 Love Live! as student A
 Ro-Kyu-Bu! as Yume Nakano

2014
 Haikyū!! as Natsu Hinata, Ms.Ono, student A
 When Supernatural Battles Became Commonplace as Tomoyo Kanzaki
 Black Butler as girl
 Your Lie in April as boy
 WIXOSS as female student
 Doraemon as clerk, girl

2015
 Absolute Duo as Lilith Bristol
 High School DxD BorN as Aika Kiriyuu
 Monster Musume as Meroune "Mero" Lorelei
 Mobile Suit Gundam: Iron-Blooded Orphans as Fuka Uno
 Crayon Shin-chan as sister's Kappa
 A Boring World Where the Concept of Dirty Jokes Doesn't Exist as boy named Yukiti
 Nintama Rantarō as princess

2016
 Danganronpa 3: The End of Hope's Peak High School as Natsumi Kuzuryu
 Keijo!!!!!!!! as girl
 Pandora in the Crimson Shell: Ghost Urn as gym uniform, caster
 Alderamin on the Sky as ninica, sia
 Bubuki/Buranki as child
 Heavy Object as cleaning service
 Magical Girl Raising Project as Yoshiko
 Monster Hunter Stories as Nariki

2018
Magical Girl Site as Sarina Shizukume

2019
My Roommate Is a Cat as Haru

2021
Suppose a Kid from the Last Dungeon Boonies Moved to a Starter Town as Kikyou

Animation film

2011
 Hayate the Combat Butler! Heaven Is a Place on Earth as Ruka Suirenji

2015
 Pandora in the Crimson Shell: Ghost Urn as bunny girl, girl
 Love Live! The School Idol Movie as school idol

OVA

2014
 Hayate the Combat Butler as Ruka Suirenji

2016
 Monster Musume as Meroune "Mero" Lorelei

Web animation

2016
 Monster Strike as Mariko Kobayashi

Games

2012
  as Neverell

2013
 The Idolmaster Million Live! as Mirai Kasuga
 Akiba's Trip: Undead & Undressed as Kati Räikkönen
 Vividred Operation as Mizuha Amagi

2014
 The Idolmaster One For All as Mirai Kasuga
 DYNAMIC CHORD feat.[reve parfait] as Ayu Suzuhara
 Majika★Majika as Airi Gekkyō

2015
 Omega Labyrinth as Aina Akemiya
 Photon Angels as Fee, Fran
  as Sophie Hernnet
 Crusader Quest as Sara
  as Makina
 :ja:しんぐんデストロ〜イ! as Mirai Kasuga
  as Claws of Akane, Iwami Mitsumitsu
 Diss World as Bertha
 Tokyo Xanadu as Mitsuki Hokuto
  as Yuuko Megasawa
  as Ōgami Kirara
 Monster Musume Online as Meroune "Mero" Lorelei
 Royal flush Heroes as Joyce Fraser

2016
 Akiba's Trip as Kati Raikkonen
 Collar×Malice as HANA
 Code:Realize as Shirley Gordon
 Vacuum tube dolls as Nancy
 Muramasa miyabi as Houzouin Insyun
 Tokyo Xanadu eX+ as Mitsuki Hokuto
 Drift Girls as Haruka Umitani
 Formation Girls as Kira Sasai
2017
 Azur Lane as USS Independence, KMS U-81

2018
  Bullet Girls Phantasia as Silvia Hortensia

2019
 Arknights as Grani

2020
 The Idolmaster: Starlit Season as Mirai Kasuga

2021
 Livestream: Escape from Hotel Izanami (2021), Mio Ikoma,

2023
 Honkai: Star Rail as Herta

Drama CD

2015
 The Idolmaster Million Live! as Mirai Kasuga
  as Kaguya

Radio 
 Yamazaki Haruka "To the sky where we are running" (2011)
 THE IDOLM@STER MillionRADIO (2013 -, Live Niconico)
 When Supernatural Battles Became Radio (2014 – 2015, }
 Absolute Radio ~Couryou Academy Broadcasting Club~ (2014 – 2015, Internet Radio Station Onsen)
 Radio Dot AI, Yamazaki Haruka "Piyoshichi was said to be a pretty royal female voice actor but the enthusiast temperament inside of her disturbs." (2015,  and )
 Daily conversation with Monster Girls (2015, Internet Radio Station Onsen)
  (2016 -, Live Niconico)

Radio CD

2015
 THE IDOLM@STER MILLION RADIO! DJCD Vol.01
 Radio CD "Absolute Radio ~Couryou Academy Broadcasting Club~" Vol.1 – 2
 Radio CD "When Supernatural Battles Became Radio" Vol.1 – 2

TV program 
  (2015, TV Tokyo) MC

DVD•Blu-ray disc 
  (2013)
 THE IDOLM@STER 8th ANNIVERSARY HOP! STEP!! FESTIV@L!!! (2014)
 THE IDOLM@STER M@STERS OF IDOL WORLD!!2014 (2014)
 THE IDOLM@STER MILLION LIVE! 1stLIVE HAPPY☆PERFORM@NCE!! Blu-ray (2014)
 Animelo Summer Live 2013 -FLAG NINE- 8.24 (2014)
 THE IDOLM@STER MILLION LIVE! 2ndLIVE ENJOY H@RMONY!! Live Blu-ray (2015)
 Animelo Summer Live 2014 (2015)
 THE IDOLM@STER M@STER OF IDOL WORLD!!2015 Live Blu-ray (2016)

Stage 
 Sizu☆Geki Stride (2016)

Other contents 
 AG Academy Ani☆Bun as China Haruno (2010)
 Kimino Tonaride Seisyun Tyu as Miu Kashiwagi (2011)

Discography

Singles

Album

References

External links

 YAMAZAKI HARUKA .Pyonkichi on Instagram

1991 births
Living people
Japanese voice actresses
NBCUniversal Entertainment Japan artists
People from Kanagawa Prefecture
Hayate the Combat Butler